Atichai Phoemsap is a Thai amateur boxer. As an amateur, he won the 2018 Summer Youth Olympics and 2018 AIBA Youth World Boxing Championships.

Amateur career
Phoemsap represented Thailand in the AIBA Youth World Boxing Championships and defeated Hungarian boxer Adrián Orbán to win the gold medal. Moreover, he competed in the 2018 Youth Olympics and defeated Ukrainian boxer Taras Bonarchuk in the final and won the gold medal.

References

Living people
2000 births
Atichai Phoemsap
Boxers at the 2018 Summer Youth Olympics
Youth Olympic gold medalists for Thailand
Atichai Phoemsap
Atichai Phoemsap